Yushan Island is in Xiangshan County in northeast Zhejiang province, Eastern China. It is the most southeastern island in Xiangshan, located 27 miles from Shipu Town, near Ningbo City. It is situated in the north and south ocean current intersection belt, and is the line basis points of China’s territorial waters. The island's north section is the largest, with a total land area of 2.3 square kilometers.

There are three sub-islands called North Yushan, South Yushan, and the Five Tiger Reef.

Yushan Island is known as "the first fishing area in Asia". The island contains unique reefs with crystal-clear seawater, in addition to being rich with fish, shellfish and algae resources — in total more than 300 types.

Nature
In 2008, Yushan Island was registered as a national marine sanctuary to contain rich local marine ecosystem, and was also designated as agricultural grounds to promote natural resources including by artificial reefs. The seawater is so clear that the visibility can exceed 10 meters.

Today, 300 to 400 people reside on Yushan Island due in large part to the number of freshwater resources.

References

External links

Islands of Zhejiang
Nature reserves in China